The Wimbledon Cup is a National Rifle Association of America trophy.

Wimbledon Cup may refer to:

 Wimbledon Cup (Falkland Islands), Falklands Islands Rifle Association trophy.
 Wimbledon Cup (croquet), World Croquet Federation trophy.

See also 
 The Championships, Wimbledon